Ludwig Deckardt (born 23 March 1902, date of death unknown) was an Austrian middle-distance runner. He competed in the men's 800 metres at the 1924 Summer Olympics.

References

External links
 

1902 births
Year of death missing
Athletes (track and field) at the 1924 Summer Olympics
Austrian male middle-distance runners
Olympic athletes of Austria
Place of birth missing